Shiraguppi is a village in the southern state of Karnataka, India. It is located in the Athni taluk of Belgaum district in Karnataka.

Demographics
 India census, Shiraguppi had a population of 9189 with 4676 males and 4513 females.
Shirguppi is located on Bijapur-Chikkodi road. The nearest railway station is Ugar and Airport is Belgaum. Shiraguppi has got "Google Award" for best village in the state. Recently state government has awarded as "Nirmal Gram".
Today Shiraguppi has become a centre place for the small villages around it.

Agriculture

Main crop Grapes and Sugar cane, nowadays farmers are using a new technology for their agriculture land.
Other crops like- Jowar, Wheat, Channa, Sunflower, Ginger, Onion.
Fruits:  Banana, Papaya, Grapes etc.
Flowers: Rose, Chrysanthemum, Marigold etc.
Water Supply: Krishna river is the nearest around 2 km far and supply the water from there. Many schemes are associated to supply the water and Separate water tank for irrigation uses for their land with own cost, drip irrigation system, etc.

Transportation

Shiraguppi is located by a national highway.
From Shiraguppi village Railway station is 14 km located at Ugar Khurd, 12 km located at Shedbal Railway station and Airport is 100 km located in Belgaum district and also state highway passes through the village.

References

 here very poor family are belong

External links
 http://Belgaum.nic.in/

Villages in Belagavi district